The 2021/22 FIS Cup (ski jumping) was the 17th FIS Cup season in ski jumping for men and the 10th for women.

Other competitive circuits this season include the World Cup, Grand Prix, Continental Cup, FIS Race and Alpen Cup.

Calendar

Men

Women

Overall standings

Men

Women

Notes

References 

2021 in ski jumping
2022 in ski jumping
FIS Cup (ski jumping)